Hajjiabad-e Nazri (also Romanized as Ḩājjīābād-e Naẓrī; also known as Shahrak-e Shahīd Bāhonar and Shahīdbāhonar) is a village in Ekhtiarabad Rural District, in the Central District of Kerman County, Kerman Province, Iran. At the 2006 census, its population was 1,949, in 481 families.

References 

Populated places in Kerman County